Supernaw is a surname. Notable people with the surname include:

Doug Supernaw (1960–2020), American country music singer-songwriter and musician
Kywin Supernaw (born 1975), American football player
Phillip Supernaw (born 1990), American football player